WJRS (104.9 FM) is a radio station broadcasting a country music format that is licensed to Jamestown, Kentucky, and serving the Jamestown/Russell Springs area in Russell County, Kentucky. The station is currently owned by Lake Cumberland Broadcasters, LLC, which also owns WJKY. The two stations share broadcast facilities and transmitting tower at 2804 South US 127 on the south side of Russell Springs.

WJRS features programming from Local Radio Networks.

History 
The station signed on the air on September 3, 1966, and it has been broadcasting a country music format ever since.

WJKY simulcasted the FM station's signal until sometime in the 2000s, when the AM station became an ESPN Radio affiliate. In 2019, WJKY changed over to the JACK Radio format.

References

External links
LakerCountry.com -- WJRS website 

JRS
Radio stations established in 1966
Jamestown, Kentucky
Country radio stations in the United States
1966 establishments in Kentucky